Büttner Propeller, also known as Gerald Büttner - Obernkirchen, is a German aircraft manufacturer based in Obernkirchen and founded by Gerald Büttner. The company specializes in the design and manufacture of powered parachutes, paramotors and aircraft propellers. The aircraft are ready-to-fly designs for the European Fédération Aéronautique Internationale microlight and  categories.

The company has a line of paramotors (Rucksackmotoren) called the Büttner Crazy Plane and a line of powered parachutes (Gleitschirm Trikes) called the Büttner Crazy Flyer. At one time it also produced the Büttner Easy Plane.

Büttner also builds two-bladed carved wooden and two, three and four bladed plastic ultralight aircraft propellers.

Aircraft

See also
List of aircraft propeller manufacturers

References

External links

Aircraft manufacturers of Germany
Ultralight aircraft
Homebuilt aircraft
Paramotors
Powered parachutes